Fathali Oveisi (11 January 1946 – 5 October 2021) was an Iranian actor and director.

Biography
He is best known for Captain Khorshid (1987), Baanoo (1999), Hamoun (1990), Love-stricken (1992) and Cactus. His two directorial films are Sarboland and Maryam and Mitil. He went into a coma on 30 September 2021 due to a massive stroke, and died on 5 October 2021 at the age of 75.

Filmography
 The Return of Lucky Luck 
EfratiHa
 Shir O Asal 
 Rich and Poor TV series
 Chahar changooli 
 Kolahi Baraye Baran 
 Zirzamin TV Series 
 Dast Balaye Dast TV Series
 Fasten Our Seatbelt TV Series 
 Baghcheh Mino TV Series 
 Tofang-e Sarpor TV Series 
 Without Description TV Series
 Cheragh-e Jadoo TV Series
 Moomiayi 3
 Tell Him That I Love Him TV Series
 Legion
 Cactus TV Series
 Takhti
 Gavmishha
 Loneliest Leader TV Series
 Hadese dar Kandovan
 Patak
 Marzieh
 Mikhaham zende bemanam
 Sarboland
 Akharin khoon
 Badal
 Parvaz ra be khater bespar
 Kheirollah va Sandoughche Asrar TV Series
 Del Shodegan
 Parande-ye ahanin
 The Love-stricken
 Baanoo
 Cactus
 Ghorogh
 Hekayat-e aan mard-e khoshbakht
 Saye khial
 Gol-e sorkh
 Hamoun
 Reyhaneh
 Sorb
 Hey Joe
 Parandeyeh koochake khoshbakhti
 Koochak-e Jangali TV Series
 Captain Khorshid
 Madar
 Sarbedaran
 Ghadeghan

References

External links

1946 births
2021 deaths
Iranian male actors
Iranian male film actors
Iranian male television actors